The 1992 Forte Hotels Matchroom League was a  professional non-ranking snooker tournament that was played from 12 January to 31 May 1992.

Stephen Hendry won in the final 9–2 against Steve Davis. Two maximum breaks were achieved during this tournament; the first was by John Parrott in his match with Tony Meo; while the second was recorded by Stephen Hendry against Willie Thorne.


League phase

Top four qualified for the play-offs. If points were level then most frames won determined their positions. If two players had an identical record then the result in their match determined their positions. If that ended 4–4 then the player who got to four first was higher.

 Stephen Hendry 5–3 John Parrott
 James Wattana 4–4 Gary Wilkinson
 Tony Drago 6–2 Willie Thorne
 Neal Foulds 5–3 Steve James
 Stephen Hendry 6–2 Steve James
 James Wattana 6–2 Mike Hallett
 Gary Wilkinson 6–2 Neal Foulds
 Tony Meo 7–1 Jimmy White
 James Wattana 6–2 Steve James
 Steve Davis 6–2 Allison Fisher
 Steve Davis 6–2 John Parrott
 Tony Drago 5–3 Steve James
 Neal Foulds 7–1 Tony Meo
 Willie Thorne 5–3 James Wattana
 Jimmy White 5–3 Steve Davis
 Mike Hallett 4–4 Tony Drago
 Jimmy White 6–2 Allison Fisher
 John Parrott 5–3 Tony Drago
 Steve Davis 6–2 Mike Hallett
 Stephen Hendry 6–2 Neal Foulds
 Tony Meo 4–4 Willie Thorne
 Gary Wilkinson 6–2 Allison Fisher
 Jimmy White 5–3 John Parrott
 James Wattana 5–3 Stephen Hendry
 Steve Davis 5–3 Tony Meo
 Gary Wilkinson 4–4 Willie Thorne
 Neal Foulds 5–3 Tony Drago
 Allison Fisher 4–4 Tony Meo
 Gary Wilkinson 4–4 Stephen Hendry
 Tony Drago 5–3 Jimmy White
 Mike Hallett 4–4 Gary Wilkinson
 Tony Meo 5–3 Steve James
 Steve Davis 5–3 Neal Foulds
 Steve James 7–1 Allison Fisher
 Stephen Hendry 5–3 Tony Meo
 Stephen Hendry 6–2 Steve Davis
 John Parrott 5–3 Gary Wilkinson
 Jimmy White 4–4 Willie Thorne
 Neal Foulds 5–3 Mike Hallett
 Allison Fisher 5–3 Neal Foulds
 Steve Davis 4–4 Gary Wilkinson
 Stephen Hendry 6–2 Allison Fisher
 Jimmy White 5–3 Stephen Hendry
 Steve James 6–2 Mike Hallett
 Tony Drago 6–2 Tony Meo
 John Parrott 8–0 Willie Thorne
 Steve James 5–3 Gary Wilkinson
 James Wattana 6–2 Allison Fisher
 Steve Davis 5–3 Tony Drago
 Jimmy White 5–3 Mike Hallett
 James Wattana 6–2 Tony Meo
 Neal Foulds 4–4 John Parrott
 Allison Fisher 5–3 Mike Hallett
 Tony Drago 6–2 James Wattana
 John Parrott 5–3 Tony Meo
 Willie Thorne 6–2 Mike Hallett
 James Wattana 4–4 John Parrott
 Steve James 4–4 Jimmy White
 Willie Thorne 4–4 Steve Davis
 Stephen Hendry 7–1 Mike Hallett
 Jimmy White 5–3 Gary Wilkinson
 Steve James 4–4 Willie Thorne
 James Wattana 4–4 Neal Foulds
 James Wattana 6–2 Jimmy White
 Stephen Hendry 6–2 Tony Drago
 Mike Hallett 5–3 John Parrott
 Steve James 5–3 Steve Davis
 Tony Meo 5–3 Gary Wilkinson
 Neal Foulds 7–1 Willie Thorne
 John Parrott 6–2 Allison Fisher
 Allison Fisher 6–2 Tony Drago
 John Parrott 6–2 Steve James
 Gary Wilkinson 6–2 Tony Drago
 Steve Davis 6–2 James Wattana
 Stephen Hendry 4–4 Willie Thorne
 Jimmy White 4–4 Neal Foulds
 Mike Hallett 5–3 Tony Meo
 Willie Thorne 5–3 Allison Fisher

Play-offs 
30–31 May (Bournemouth International Centre, Bournemouth, England)

References

Premier League Snooker
1992 in snooker
1992 in British sport